Covington is a town in Garfield County, Oklahoma, United States. The population was 477 at the 2020 census.

Geography
Covington is located in southeastern Garfield County at  (36.307490, -97.588379). Oklahoma State Highway 74 passes through the center of town as First Street, leading north  to Garber and south  to Oklahoma City. Oklahoma State Highway 164 leads southeast, then east  to Perry.

Demographics

As of the census of 2000, there were 553 people, 224 households, and 159 families residing in the town. There were 259 housing units at an average density of 643.1 per square mile (250.0/km2). The racial makeup of the town was 93.49% White, 3.98% Native American, 0.18% Pacific Islander, 0.18% from other races, and 2.17% from two or more races. Hispanic or Latino of any race were 1.27% of the population.

There were 224 households, out of which 36.6% had children under the age of 18 living with them, 53.6% were married couples living together, 13.8% had a female householder with no husband present, and 29.0% were non-families. 27.7% of all households were made up of individuals, and 16.1% had someone living alone who was 65 years of age or older. The average household size was 2.47 and the average family size was 3.01.

In the town, the population was spread out, with 28.4% under the age of 18, 7.6% from 18 to 24, 29.8% from 25 to 44, 17.4% from 45 to 64, and 16.8% who were 65 years of age or older. The median age was 36 years. For every 100 females, there were 93.4 males. For every 100 females age 18 and over, there were 87.7 males.

The median income for a household in the town was $26,979, and the median income for a family was $32,222. Males had a median income of $30,625 versus $13,594 for females. The per capita income for the town was $12,788. About 10.5% of families and 13.4% of the population were below the poverty line, including 19.2% of those under age 18 and 6.7% of those age 65 or over.

Education
Its school district is Covington-Douglas Schools.

Points of interest 

 North Central Oklahoma Cactus Botanical Garden
 Kimmell Barn
 R. E. Hoy No. 1 Oil Well

References

External links
 Encyclopedia of Oklahoma History and Culture - Covington

Towns in Garfield County, Oklahoma
Towns in Oklahoma